The gens Cottia was a plebeian family of equestrian rank.  It is known chiefly from the brothers Marcus and Publius Cottius, equites of Tauromenium in Sicily.  They served as witnesses against Verres.

See also
 List of Roman gentes

References

Roman gentes